Marko Čolaković (born 20 July 1980 in Titograd, now Podgorica) is a Montenegrin retired footballer.

External sources

 

1980 births
Living people
Footballers from Podgorica
Association football defenders
Serbia and Montenegro footballers
Montenegrin footballers
FK Zeta players
Wisła Płock players
FK Leotar players
OFK Titograd players
First League of Serbia and Montenegro players
Ekstraklasa players
Montenegrin First League players
Premier League of Bosnia and Herzegovina players
Montenegrin expatriate footballers
Expatriate footballers in Poland
Montenegrin expatriate sportspeople in Poland
Expatriate footballers in Bosnia and Herzegovina
Montenegrin expatriate sportspeople in Bosnia and Herzegovina